This is a list of awards and nominations received by Willie Nelson. Willie Nelson is an American country musician whose critical success with the albums Shotgun Willie, Phases and Stages, and the commercial success of Red Headed Stranger and Stardust made him one of the most recognized artists in country music.

Awards

References

Nelson, Willie
Awards and nominations